William Davitte "Mary" Calhoun (June 23, 1890 – January 28, 1955) was a former Major League Baseball player who played six games, all at first base, for the Boston Braves in 1913.

References

External links

1890 births
1955 deaths
People from Rockmart, Georgia
Sportspeople from the Atlanta metropolitan area
Baseball players from Georgia (U.S. state)
Major League Baseball pitchers
Boston Braves players
Jersey City Skeeters players
Macon Peaches players
Mobile Sea Gulls players